Euderces pini is a species of beetle in the family Cerambycidae. It was described by Guillaume-Antoine Olivier in 1795 and is known from the United States, between eastern parts of the country and Texas.

References

Euderces
Beetles described in 1795
Beetles of the United States
Taxa named by Guillaume-Antoine Olivier